William FitzWilliam or Fitzwilliam may refer to:

William Fitzwilliam (Sheriff of London) (c. 1460–1534), protégé of Cardinal Wolsey
William FitzWilliam, 1st Earl of Southampton (c. 1490–1542), English courtier
William Fitzwilliam (Dean of Wells)
William Fitzwilliam (died 1559) (1506–1559), MP
William FitzWilliam (Lord Deputy) (1526–1599), Lord Deputy of Ireland
William FitzWilliam, 2nd Baron FitzWilliam (1609–1658), English politician
William FitzWilliam, 3rd Viscount FitzWilliam (c. 1610–1670), Irish nobleman
William Fitzwilliam, 3rd Earl Fitzwilliam (1719–1756), British peer
William Fitzwilliam, 4th Earl Fitzwilliam (1748–1833), British Whig statesman
William Wentworth-Fitzwilliam, 6th Earl Fitzwilliam (1815–1902), British peer and Liberal politician
William Wentworth-Fitzwilliam, 7th Earl Fitzwilliam (1872–1943), British Army officer, politician and aristocrat
William Fitzwilliam, 1st Earl Fitzwilliam (1643–1719), English nobleman, politician, and peer
William Fitzwilliam, Viscount Milton (d. 1835), British Member of Parliament for Malton

See also
Earl Fitzwilliam, many who were named William FitzWilliam